Metropolitan Philip may refer to:

 Philip I, Metropolitan of Moscow in 1464–1473
 Philip II, Metropolitan of Moscow in 1566–1568
 Philip Saliba, Metropolitan of All North America of the Antiochian Orthodox Christian Archdiocese of North America in 1966–2014